Giovanni Maria da Varano (1481–1527) was an Italian statesman, and the duke of Camerino starting in 1515.

He was the son of Giulio Cesare da Varano. He was married in 1520 to Caterina Cybo (1501-1557), granddaughter of Lorenzo de Medici. Together, Caterina and Giovanni Maria, had only a daughter Giulia, who in 1535 married Guidobaldo II della Rovere. Giovanni died from the plague in 1527.

References

Sources

1481 births
1527 deaths
16th-century condottieri
People from Camerino